The George Salmon House, also known as the C. Douglas Wilson Farm, is located near Travelers Rest, South Carolina on SC Highway 414, off of US Highway 25.

A log house was initially built by George Salmon, a surveyor and one of the earliest settlers to the area, ca1784. Additions to the house transformed it into a two-story plantation plain style house on a brick foundation with a gable roof.  In addition to the house, four other contributing properties are on the property including two multipurpose storage buildings, a chicken coop and a smokehouse.

References

External links

National Register of Historic Places in Greenville County, South Carolina
Houses completed in 1850
Houses in Greenville County, South Carolina